The tournament was not held in 1991.

Horacio de la Peña and Jorge Lozano won in the final 2–6, 6–4, 7–6, against Ģirts Dzelde and T.J. Middleton.

Seeds

  Mark Koevermans /  Udo Riglewski (quarterfinals)
  Jacco Eltingh /  Tom Kempers (semifinals)
  David Adams /  Martin Damm (quarterfinals)
  Byron Black /  Paul Wekesa (quarterfinals)

Draw

Draw

External links
 Draw

1992 Grand Prix Hassan II
1992 ATP Tour